"Grand bain" is a song by French singer Dadju featuring French rapper Ninho. It was released on 19 June 2020.

Charts

Weekly charts

Year-end charts

Certifications

References

2020 singles
2020 songs
Dadju songs
French-language songs
Ninho songs
SNEP Top Singles number-one singles